Hippolyte Victor Valentin Sebron (21 August 1801, Caudebec-en-Caux - 1 September 1879, Paris) was a French landscape, cityscape and portrait painter. He was also a photographer and worked in pastels.

Biography 

He studied at the École des Beaux-arts. At first, he worked as a decorative painter. His first exhibition at the Salon came in 1825. Soon, he gained a reputation as a painter of interior portraits. Later, he became a student of Léon Cogniet.

In 1827, while decorating the new Théâtre de l'Ambigu-Comique, he was taken as a student by Louis Daguerre and became a collaborator on Daguerre's popular theatre dioramas.
     
After some time, he began to feel that he was not getting proper recognition, but chose to remain in the partnership, despite offers of permanent work in London during a trip to England. The break-up came when the French government awarded Daguerre an annual pension of 2,000 Francs for devising new techniques that Sebron felt were his ideas. He also claimed to have been entirely responsible for fourteen of the thirty dioramas created during his time with Daguerre.

He quit making dioramas entirely, although his style would always reflect that experience. In 1830, he made a visit to Italy where he created over 150 views of cities and monuments. That, however, proved to be just the beginning of his travels. In 1838, he went to Spain, Portugal and North Africa with Baron Isidore Justin Séverin Taylor  to create an illustrated album. After executing a commission from King Louis-Philippe I for the historical museum at Versailles, he spent some time in England. This was followed by another trip to Spain and Morocco.

During the Revolution of 1848, over twenty of his works were destroyed in the burning of the Château de Neuilly. Soon after, he began planning a trip to North America. He left in 1849 and would spend the next six years travelling throughout Canada and the United States, with stays in Louisiana and New York, where he participated in the Exhibition of the Industry of All Nations. Nevertheless, he found that the demand for art in America was much less than in Europe and turned to painting portraits to make a living.

Upon returning to France in 1855, he still found himself unable to settle down, wandering throughout Europe and the Mediterranean, as far as Egypt, Istanbul and Syria, where he toured the ruins in 1870. He did, however, die in Paris.

Selected paintings

References

External links 

Brief overview and biographical notes @ Know LA (The Encyclopedia of Louisiana) by Richard Anthony Lewis, Louisiana State Museum
Arcadja Auctions: More works by Sebron

1801 births
1879 deaths
People from Seine-Maritime
Landscape painters
Cityscape artists
Dioramas
19th-century French painters